Washington Crown Center (formerly Franklin Mall) is a 676,000 square-foot regional enclosed shopping mall in North Franklin Township, Washington County, Pennsylvania, just outside the city of Washington and south of Pittsburgh. The mall's anchor stores are Marshalls and Rural King. There are seven vacant anchor and junior anchor stores that were once Sears, Macy's (originally Kaufmann's), The Bon-Ton, Ross Dress for Less, Jo-Ann Fabrics, Ulta Beauty and Hollywood Theaters.

History
The mall opened in 1969 as Franklin Mall, with Troutman's, Sears and Grant City (which became Hills in 1976) as its anchors. An Acme supermarket was also located in the mall parking lot just past Grant's/Hills. It closed in 1977. Troutman's closed in 1984 and was sold to Pomeroy's, which in turn converted to The Bon-Ton in 1987. A 1985 expansion to the mall added Hess's and a new Hills, while converting the original Hills location to a food court and additional retail space.

In 1999, the mall was renamed Washington Crown Center and underwent a renovation. Among the changes were the addition of a movie theater on the site of the former Hess's, which closed four years prior; the conversion of Hills to Ames, and the addition of Kaufmann's as a fourth anchor. The Ames store closed in 2002 and became Gander Mountain in 2003, while Kaufmann's was converted to Macy's in 2006. In 2013, Marshalls replaced Old Navy.  In 2014, Ross Dress for Less took 25,000 square feet of former specialty retail shop space. The trend of replacing small shops with big box stores continued through 2014 with the addition of Jo-Ann Fabrics, Ulta, and Books-a-Million. In January 2015, PREIT announced that it was planning on selling Washington Crown Center along with four other malls.

In August 2016, PREIT sold the Mall for $20 million. It was reported that the occupancy had dropped to 87.4% before the sale and had represented a drop in performance.  Macy’s and Gander Mountain closed in 2017. Gander Mountain would be replaced by Rural King in March 2018. The Bon-Ton closed all locations by August 2018.  On August 31, 2019, it was announced that Sears would be closing this location a part of a plan to close 92 stores nationwide. The store closed on December 15, 2019. This was the last remaining Sears store in western Pennsylvania (not counting Sears Hometown and Outlet Stores).

On October 3, 2020, Hollywood Theaters announced it would be closing all of their locations permanently due to the COVID-19 pandemic. Ross Dress for Less closed on January 19, 2021. This left Rural King, Marshalls, Ulta Beauty, and Jo-Ann Stores as the mall's only anchor stores. However, Ulta Beauty moved to a nearby shopping center in April 2021. M@C Discount, an online auctioneer reselling returned merchandise from mainstream retailers, operates from a portion of the former Macy's location as of December 2021.

References

External links
Washington Crown Center official site

Shopping malls in Metro Pittsburgh
Shopping malls in Pennsylvania
Buildings and structures in Washington County, Pennsylvania
Tourist attractions in Washington County, Pennsylvania
Shopping malls established in 1969
1969 establishments in Pennsylvania
Kohan Retail Investment Group